In crystallography and solid state physics, the Laue equations relate incoming waves to outgoing waves in the process of elastic scattering, where the photon energy or light temporal frequency does not change by scattering, by a crystal lattice. They are named after physicist Max von Laue (1879–1960).

Due to elastic scattering , three vectors. If the scattering satisfies this equation, all the crystal lattice points scatter the incoming wave toward the scattering direction (the direction along ). If the equation is not satisfied, then for any scattering direction, only some lattice points scatter the incoming wave. (This physical interpretation of the equation is based on the assumption that scattering at a lattice point is made in a way that the scattering wave and the incoming wave have the same phase at the point.) It also can be seen as the conservation of momentums as  since  is the wavevector for a plane wave associated with parallel crystal lattice planes. (Wavefronts of the plane wave are coincident with these lattice planes.) 

The equations are equivalent to Bragg's law; the Laue equations are vector equations while Bragg's law is in a form that is easier to solve, but these tell the same content.

The Laue equations 

(So  indicating each lattice point is an integer linear combination of the primitive vectors.)

Then the vector , called the scattering vector or transferred wavevector, measures the difference between the incoming and outgoing wavevectors.

The three conditions that the scattering vector  must satisfy, called the Laue equations, are the following:

 

where numbers  are integer numbers. Each choice of integers , called Miller indices, determines a scattering vector . Hence there are infinitely many scattering vectors that satisfy the Laue equations as there are infinitely many choices of Miller indices . (This is the meaning of the Laue equations as shown below.) This condition allows a single incident beam to be diffracted in infinitely many directions. However, the beams corresponding to high Miller indices are very weak and can't be observed. These equations are enough to find a basis of the reciprocal lattice (since each observed  indicates a point of the reciprocal lattice of the crystal under the measurement), from which the crystal lattice can be determined. This is the principle of x-ray crystallography.

Mathematical derivation 

For an incident plane wave at a single frequency  (and the angular frequency ) on a crystal, the diffracted waves from the crystal can be thought as the sum of outgoing plane waves from the crystal. (In fact, any wave can be represented as the sum of plane waves, see Fourier Optics.) The incident wave and one of plane waves of the diffracted wave are represented as
 

For simplicity we take waves as scalars here, even though the main case of interest is an electromagnetic field, which is a vector. We can think these scalar waves as components of vector waves along a certain axis (x, y, or z axis) of the Cartesian coordinate system.

The incident and diffracted waves propagate through space independently, except at points of the lattice  of the crystal, where they resonate with the oscillators, so the phases of these waves must coincide. At each point  of the lattice , we have 
 
or equivalently, we must have
 
for some integer , that depends on the point . So
 
(We still use  instead of  since both the notations essentially indicate some integer.) By rearranging terms, we get
 

Now, it is enough to check that this condition is satisfied at the primitive vectors  (which is exactly what the Laue equations say), because, at any lattice point , we have 
 
where  is the integer . The claim that each parenthesis, e.g.

This ensures that if the Laue equations are satisfied, then the incoming and outgoing (diffracted) wave have the same phase at each point of the crystal lattice, so the oscillations of atoms of the crystal, that follows the incoming wave, can at the same time generate the outgoing wave at the same phase of the incoming wave.

Relation to reciprocal lattices and Bragg's Law

But notice that this is nothing but the Laue equations. Hence we identify , means that allowed scattering vectors  are those equal to reciprocal lattice vectors  for a crystal in diffraction, and this is the meaning of the Laue equations. This fact is sometimes called the Laue condition. In this sense, diffraction patterns are a way to experimentally measure the reciprocal lattice for a crystal lattice.

The Laue condition can be rewritten as the following.
 

Applying the elastic scattering condition  (In other words, the incoming and diffracted waves are at the same (temporal) frequency. We can also say that the energy per photon does not change.) to the above equation, we obtain
 

The second equation is obtained from the first equation by using .

The result  (also ) is an equation for a plane (geometry) (as the set of all points indicated by  satisfying this equation) as its equivalent equation  is a plane equation in geometry. Such a plane is called Bragg plane. Each  is by definition the wavevector of a plane wave in the Fourier series of a spatial function which periodicity follows the crystal lattice (e.g., the function representing the electronic density of the crystal), wavefronts of each plane wave in the Fourier series is perpendicular to the plane wave's wavevector , and these wavefronts are coincident with parallel crystal lattice planes.

With these, we now derive Bragg's law that is equivalent to the Laue equations (also called the Laue condition):

References
Kittel, C. (1976). Introduction to Solid State Physics, New York: John Wiley & Sons. 

Notes

Crystallography